Chris Handy (born 28 March 1950) is a former rugby union football player, having played prop for both the Australia and Queensland. He played 6 internationals for Australia between 1978 and 1980.

Handy was educated at St Joseph's College, Gregory Terrace in Brisbane where he played in the school first XV. After he left school he played his club rugby for Brothers Old Boys.

After his playing career finished Handy worked as  a publican as well as a rugby union colour commentator and analyst for various television networks.

References

1950 births
Living people
Rugby union props
Queensland Reds players
People educated at St Joseph's College, Gregory Terrace
Australia international rugby union players
Australian rugby union commentators